Nigerian Naval Engineering College (NNEC) is a Nigerian Government Monotechnic Institute located in Sapele, Delta State, South-South Nigeria.The college is a diploma awarding institute, established by the federal government of Nigeria in the year 1982 to train engineers, technologists and craftmen.

Administration
The college is headed by Rear Admiral Akinsola Johnson who serves as the commandant of the college. The base has seven schools; namely, marine engineering, Weapon Electrical Engineering, automobile, nuclear, biological, fire fighting and air engineering. The commandant said the status of the school will be changed to University.

External links
  Official Website

References

Universities and colleges in Nigeria